Yongju may refer to:

Yeongju, a city in South Korea
Yongju, a city in North Korea
Ningbo opera (甬劇), or Yongju